Aldinga Bay is a bay located on the east coast of Gulf St Vincent in South Australia about  south-southwest of Adelaide city centre.

Extent & description
Aldinga Bay lies between Snapper Point in the suburb of Aldinga Beach at its northern extremity and the remains of Myponga Jetty at Myponga Beach at its southern extremity.

Ports and other settlements
The bay has no infrastructure for maritime use apart from access to the beach from the road network to launch and retrieve small boats at specific locations permitted by the local government authority, the City of Onkaparinga.
The following settlements are located along its coastline from north to south: Aldinga Beach and  Sellicks Beach in the City of Onkaparinga and Myponga Beach in the District Council of Yankalilla.

Protected areas
The waters of Aldinga Bay are within the Encounter Marine Park. The south-eastern part of the Aldinga Reef aquatic reserve is within the bay.

Notes

Citations and references

Citations

References

Bays of South Australia
 Gulf St Vincent